Sodium silox is the name for an organosilicon compound that serves as a source of the siloxide anion [(CH3)3C]3SiO−.  Complexes of this bulky anionic ligand often adopt with low coordination numbers.  Examples include Ti(silox)3, Nb(silox)3(PMe3), and [Cr(silox)3]−.

Properties of silox and related complexes
The sodium derivative, which has salt-like properties, is a cubane-type cluster.

Related bulky anionic ligands include C5Me5−, (Me3Si)2N−, and NacNac−.  Silox has a larger cone angle than C5Me5− and is a poorer donor.  It is also larger than silylamides.  For these reasons, silox anion forms highly unsaturated complexes.

Complexes with high coordinative unsaturation display high reactivity so long as they do not undergo intramolecular reactions.  Silox offers this possibility.  Examples of high reactivity exhibited by metal-silox compounds include the C-O bond in carbon monoxide and the C-N bond in pyridine.

Preparation
Na(silox) is usually prepared by deprotonation of the silanol (t-Bu)3SiOH, which is prepared by a multistep route via the intermediacy of (t-Bu)2SiF2.  It is also obtained by treatment of tBu3SiNa with nitrous oxide.

Related compounds
Sodium trimethylsiloxide

References

Organosilicon compounds
Sodium compounds